Martinsville High School is the only high school located in Martinsville, Indiana just off Interstate 69.  It is part of the Metropolitan School District of Martinsville.  Students from John R. Wooden Middle School transfer to Martinsville High School after the end of the 8th grade school year.

Administration
The Martinsville Administration as of the 2021 - 2022 school year.
Eric Bowlen, Principal
Ryan Wagner, Assistant Principal
Brian Dugger, Assistant Principal
Audrey Jackson, Assistant Principal
Kip Staggs, Athletic Director
Lori Lund, Director of Guidance
Sarah Basham, Dean of Students

Building
Martinsville High School (MHS) has many classrooms, a large library-media center called the Integrated Media Center (IMC), and a large area dedicated to the performing arts which adjoins the auditorium. There is a driving range located on school grounds as well.

MHS features a vocational school, a separate but attached building. Vocational classes allow students to learn trades in real world environments. There are classes for welding, woodworking, electricity, and auto repair. Building trades students construct a house each year as part of their curriculum.

Martinsville High School is building a field house adjacent to the high school and will be completed in Spring 2021. The field house will have 3 basketball courts, wrestling and cheerleading practice space, family restrooms and lockers. The field house will be used for both athletic and academic clubs for students.  Inside the school there is a large main gymnasium, an auxiliary gymnasium, a second floor pool, wrestling room, weight room, and several locker rooms. Outside, the school has a softball, baseball, tennis, soccer, track, and football field.  

2019-2021 renovations include exterior lighting, door security, auditorium, gymnasium, girls' soccer team locker room. 

2020 - Girls' Softball team field was renamed Rhoden Field after longtime coach, Ken Rhoden.

The Artesian Center for Excellence (A.C.E) is a center for students to graduate with their CORE 40 diploma. The building is separate from the high school but located on campus.

Academics
In the 2018-2019 school year, Martinsville had a graduation rate of 92% and was designated a 'A' school by the Indiana Department of Education.

MHS houses a TV station within the school. Students in the MHS Rewind class produce the news for online and TV viewing (Channel 15). Students also produce and stream athletic events including basketball and football for community viewing online. The MHS Rewind class has received over 42 broadcasting awards. The school has a broadcast television class that produces news for the school and sports for local cable and has won many awards, one of which was the 2007 TV High School of the Year by IASB.

2020 - Decathlon team won their 20th ISBA State Decathlon Championship. Selected to attend the National Decathlon Championship in Alaska.

2019 - the Indiana Student State Championship held at Martinsville High School

2019 - Artesian Business PRIDE/ Governor's Work Certification program began

2018- Senior Success Center (SSC) added to MHS to assist seniors with preparation for college, vocational training or the workforce after high school.

2017-2018 - 1:1 digital education was implemented district wide. Every student received either an iPad or Chromebook to assist with their education.

2016 - 2017 - MHS implemented a 1:1 digital education program using Chromebooks. An elite team of students, known as Artie Intel was formed for the purpose of fixing student Chromebooks. Students are certified through HP. 

2016 - 2017 - MHS became a GAFE (Google Apps For Education) school, and is a Digital Citizenship Certified school through Common Sense Media.

Martinsville has many academic clubs.   The school's Business Professionals of America (BPA) club participates in state competitions.  The school has a class that produces an online publication, breakingblue.org.

Athletics
Martinsville High School is a member of the Mid-State Conference.  In 2006, they switched from Conference Indiana to the Mid-State Conference.  All schools in the Mid-State Conference (Decatur Central, Franklin, Greenwood, Mooresville, Perry Meridian, Plainfield, Whiteland) are located within 25 miles of Martinsville.  Most of the schools are also one school communities, like Martinsville, which has helped establish community rivalries.

Martinsville's athletic and academic teams are usually called the Artesians after the several mineral water springs that exist in the city.  The school logo is also a well.

Martinsville High School offers many sports for both men and women.  They offer for men: Basketball, Tennis, Cross Country, Soccer, Swimming, Track, Golf, and Baseball.  For women the school offers: Basketball, Tennis, Cross Country, Soccer, Swimming, Track, Golf, and Softball.  They also offer Wrestling, Football, Volleyball, Cheerleading, Gymnastics, and a variety of musical programs such as The Martinsville Marching Artesians, The MHS Symphonic string orchestra, the Madrigal Singers, and a show choir group called Flashin' Fascination. As well as a variety of theater production groups such as MHS Drama Club and a thespian troop. The Artesians have had many successful seasons on the football field, boasting many Indiana All-State and Indiana All-Star selections. Dating back to 2015, Riley Edgerton (LT), Chase Havlin (DE), Travis Griffey (QB), Caleb Urban (K), Andy Myers (WR), Tyler Cox (RB), Niegel Bryant (DT), Chase Mabry (WR), Ethan Haenlein (K), and Westyn Pemberton (S) have all been named to one of the prestigious lists. 

Indiana High School Athletic Association State Champions

Indiana Mr. and Miss

Notable alumni
John R. Wooden - Former Indiana State Sycamores men's basketball (1946-1948) and UCLA Bruins men's basketball head coach (1948–1975), for whom the UCLA arena court is named. Wooden was also a Purdue University alumni and was a member of the Purdue Boilermakers men's basketball team (1929–1932). Wooden is a member of the Naismith Memorial Basketball Hall of Fame and National Collegiate Basketball Hall of Fame.
Glenn M. Curtis - Former Indiana State Sycamores men's basketball head coach (1938-1947); Former Detroit Falcons (1946-1947)
Jerry Sichting - Former assistant head coach for the NBA's Phoenix Suns (2013-2015), Washington Wizards (2012–2013), Minnesota Timberwolves (2010–2011; 1995–2005) and Golden State Warriors (2008–2010). Former NBA player for the Indiana Pacers (1980–1985), Boston Celtics (1985–1988), Portland Trail Blazers (1988–1989), Charlotte Hornets (1989–1990) and Milwaukee Bucks (1990). Sichting is a Purdue University alumni and former Purdue Boilermakers men's basketball player (1975–1979).
George Pearcy - Former Basketball Association of America for the Detroit Falcons. Pearcy also was an Indiana State Sycamores men's basketball player (1939–1942). Older brother of Henry Pearcy.
Henry Pearcy - Former Basketball Association of America for the Detroit Falcons. Pearcy also was an Indiana State Sycamores men's basketball player (1939–1943). Younger brother of George Pearcy.
Christen Whitney - The Bachelor, Bachelor in Paradise
Craig Jarrett- Former NFL punter

See also
 List of high schools in Indiana

References

http://80085.digitalsports.com/2006/06/23/martinsville39s-breeden-named-miss-softball/

External links
Martinsville High School website

Public high schools in Indiana
Education in Morgan County, Indiana
Buildings and structures in Morgan County, Indiana